Qar was an official of the Sixth Dynasty of Egypt. Son of Idu, he probably lived and served between Merenre I and Pepy II.

Tomb 
The tomb of Qar (G 7101) lies north of the edge of the Eastern Giza Cemetery, north of the nearby double mastaba of Kawab. The limestone superstructure of the mastaba has entirely disappeared. The rest of the complex, save part of the stairway, was excavated from the rock. Some of the decoration of the stairways were executed in limestone blocks over the natural rock and as many of those blocks have been displaced or broken up many scenes are incomplete.

Family 
The tomb depicts several members of his family:

 His mother Khenout.
 Gefi (gfi), his wife, beloved by him (ḥmt.f mrt.f) who bears the titles of known to the king and priestess of Hathor (ḥmt-nṯr [ḥwt-ḥr]).
 Idw, a beloved son (sȝ.f mry.f) who carries at the time of the tomb construction several titles, some being already carried by his father: scribe of the royal records in the presence and overseer of the scribes.
 Nekhti, a brother (sn.f Nḫti).
 Tjetout, a beloved sister  and another beloved sister, Bendjet who is probably the person buried in G7215.

Dependents 
Several dependents of Qar were also represented with their most relevant titles:

 Idu, lector priest (ẖry-ḥbt}}).
 Idu, scribe (zš).
 Idu, no title preserved.
 Idu, true(?) document scribe of the Great House (zš mḏȝt-nṯr mȝˁ pr-ˁȝ}}).
 Ouseri, no title preserved.
 Ni-Khety, no title preserved.
 Nekheti, overseer of k3-servants.
 Nekheti, companion, supervisor of the king, scribe, noble of the king.
 Nesouhor, overseer of the portal.
 Nekermehat, no title preserved.
 Rensi, director of the dining hall.
 Kheti, scribe.
 Qar, senior lector priest.
 Qar, no title preserved.
 Name not preserved, overseer of the fowlers, .
 Name not preserved, lector priest, scribe of the god's writing of the Great House, scribe .. (..).
 Name not preserved, lector priest.

Titles 
His titles were:

Translation and indexes from Dilwyn Jones

References

External links 
The Giza Archives maintained by the Museum of Fine Arts in Boston. Quote: "This website is a comprehensive resource for research on Giza. It contains photographs and other documentation from the original Harvard University - Boston Museum of Fine Arts Expedition (1904 to 1947), from recent MFA fieldwork, and from other expeditions, museums, and universities around the world."
While still reachable the Giza Archives became Digital Giza in 2011 and is maintained by Harvard University. The website can be reached here:The Digital Giza.

People of the Sixth Dynasty of Egypt
Ancient Egyptian officials
Date of death unknown
Date of birth unknown